Ralph Chalmers (13 January 1891 – 8 May 1915) was a British fencer. He competed in the individual épée event at the 1908 Summer Olympics. He died at the Second Battle of Ypres during World War I while serving as an officer with the Suffolk Regiment.

He was one of the sons of Robert Chalmers, 1st Baron Chalmers, a British civil servant, and a Pali and Buddhist scholar.

See also
 List of Olympians killed in World War I

References

1891 births
1915 deaths
British male fencers
Olympic fencers of Great Britain
Fencers at the 1908 Summer Olympics
British military personnel killed in World War I
British Army personnel of World War I
Suffolk Regiment officers
Ralph